Nexø Boldklub Bornholm is a Danish football club currently playing in the Danish Copenhagen Series. Copenhagen Series is the fifth tier of Danish football. They play at Nexø Stadion in Nexø, which has a capacity of 3,000.

The clubs went bankrupt in 1990 and was re-founded the same year.

During their stint in the third-tier Danish 2nd Division in the 2012–13 season, Malawi international Clement Kafwafwa played for the team.

References

External links
 Official site

Football clubs in Denmark
Association football clubs established in 1915
1915 establishments in Denmark
Bornholm